Metanephrops binghami, the Caribbean lobster or Caribbean lobsterette, is a lobster which inhabits the western Atlantic region: from the Bahamas and southern Florida to French Guiana, including the Gulf of Mexico and the Caribbean Sea.

References

True lobsters
Crustaceans of the Atlantic Ocean
Crustaceans described in 1927